Chromosome 4 is one of the 23 pairs of chromosomes in humans. People normally have two copies of this chromosome. Chromosome 4 spans more than 193 million base pairs (the building material of DNA) and represents between 6 and 6.5 percent of the total DNA in cells.

Genomics
The chromosome is ~193 megabases in length. In a 2012 paper, 775 protein-encoding genes were identified on this chromosome. 211 (27.9%) of these coding sequences did not have any experimental evidence at the protein level, in 2012. 271 appear to be membrane proteins. 54 have been classified as cancer-associated proteins.

Genes

Number of genes
The following are some of the gene count estimates of human chromosome 4. Because researchers use different approaches to genome annotation their predictions of the number of genes on each chromosome varies (for technical details, see gene prediction). Among various projects, the collaborative consensus coding sequence project (CCDS) takes an extremely conservative strategy. So CCDS's gene number prediction represents a lower bound on the total number of human protein-coding genes.

Gene list 

The following is a partial list of genes on human chromosome 4. For complete list, see the link in the infobox on the right.

Diseases and disorders
The following are some of the diseases related to genes located on chromosome 4:

 Achondroplasia
 Autosomal dominant polycystic kidney disease (PKD-2)
 Bladder cancer
 Crouzonodermoskeletal syndrome
 Chronic lymphocytic leukemia
 Congenital central hypoventilation syndrome
 Ellis–Van Creveld syndrome
 Facioscapulohumeral muscular dystrophy
 Fibrodysplasia ossificans progressiva (FOP)
 Haemophilia C
 Huntington's disease
 Hemolytic uremic syndrome
 Hereditary benign intraepithelial dyskeratosis
 Hirschprung's disease
 Hypochondroplasia
 Methylmalonic acidemia
 Mucopolysaccharidosis type I
 Muenke syndrome
 Nonsyndromic deafness
 Nonsyndromic deafness, autosomal dominant
 Parkinson's disease
 Polycystic kidney disease
 Romano–Ward syndrome
 SADDAN
 Tetrahydrobiopterin deficiency
 Thanatophoric dysplasia
 Type 1
 Type 2
 Wolfram syndrome
 Wolf–Hirschhorn syndrome

Cytogenetic band

References

Further reading

External links

 
 

Chromosome 04